The Pennsylvania Canal Tunnel was the Pittsburgh terminus 
of the Pennsylvania Main Line of Public Works, a transportation system that involved other early tunnels.

History
Construction was authorized February 8, 1827, and the tunnel was completed November 10, 1829. The canal crossed the  Allegheny River on a covered bridge aqueduct, later replaced by John A. Roebling's first suspension bridge, the Allegheny Aqueduct., the canal traveled underground through most of downtown Pittsburgh, under Grant's Hill, to end in a lock leading to the Monongahela River. 

The original plan was to connect with the C&O canal at the Monongahela River, but that canal never reached its expected western end, and the tunnel's main use was to allow overflow from the canal to enter the Monongahela.  Only one or two canal boats ever went through the tunnel and lock.  The tunnel was made obsolete by the arrival of the Pennsylvania Railroad in 1852.

The canal tunnel was uncovered during the construction of the U.S. Steel Tower in 1967, and later during the construction of the subway system, which used part of the tunnel on the south side.

Photographs
 Photo by Bob Rathke
 Pennsylvania Digital Library photo
 Photo at the Pittsburgh Post-Gazette's "The Digs" blog

External links
 Tunnel information by the American Canal Society
 Grant's Hill Tunnel at philadelphiabuildings.org

References

 Pittsburgh Tribune-Review; January 13, 2008

Tunnels in Pittsburgh
Tunnels completed in 1829
Canal tunnels in the United States
Pennsylvania Canal
Water transportation in Pennsylvania